Davao del Norte's 3rd congressional district is an obsolete congressional district in Davao del Norte for the House of Representatives of the Philippines from 1987 to 1998. The district encompassed six municipalities of the previously undivided province, most of which now constitute the 2nd district. It was created ahead of the 1987 Philippine House of Representatives elections following the ratification of the 1987 constitution which established three districts for Davao del Norte. Prior to the 1987 apportionment, Davao del Norte residents elected their representatives to the national legislatures on a provincewide basis through the Davao del Norte's at-large congressional district. The district was last contested at the 1995 Philippine House of Representatives elections. It was eliminated by the 1998 reapportionment after the province lost significant territory to the new province of  Compostela Valley (now Davao de Oro) created through Republic Act No. 8740 on January 30, 1998.

Representation history

See also
Legislative districts of Davao del Norte

References

Former congressional districts of the Philippines
Politics of Davao del Norte
1987 establishments in the Philippines
1998 disestablishments in the Philippines
Congressional districts of the Davao Region
Constituencies established in 1987
Constituencies disestablished in 1998